The 1st East Asian Games were held in Shanghai, People's Republic of China from May 9 to May 18, 1993. The main stadium for the inaugural edition of the games was the Hongkou Football Stadium.

Shanghai also hosted a number of sports-themed exhibitions to coincide with the games, including exhibitions of photography, art and stamps. A total of 9 nations competed in a programme of twelve sports. Julio Iglesias and Wei Wei performed a duet at the games closing ceremony. The hosts, China, topped the medal table, winning almost two-thirds of the gold medals on offer. Japan was the second-most successful nation.

Sports

Medal table

References

 
E
East Asian Games
E
Multi-sport events in China
East Asian Games
Sports competitions in Shanghai
May 1993 sports events in Asia
1990s in Shanghai